The 1816 United States elections elected the members of the 15th United States Congress. Mississippi and Illinois were admitted as states during the 15th Congress. The election took place during the First Party System. The Democratic-Republican Party controlled the Presidency and both houses of Congress, while the Federalist Party provided only limited opposition. The election marked the start of the Era of Good Feelings, as the Federalist Party became nearly irrelevant in national politics after the War of 1812 and the Hartford Convention.

In the Presidential election, Democratic-Republican Secretary of State James Monroe easily defeated Federalist Senator Rufus King of New York. Monroe faced a more difficult challenge in securing his party's nomination, but was able to defeat Secretary of War William H. Crawford in the Democratic-Republican congressional nominating caucus. The Federalists never again fielded a presidential candidate.

In the House, Democratic-Republicans won major gains, and continued to dominate the chamber.

In the Senate, Democratic-Republicans picked up a moderate number of seats, increasing their already-dominant majority.

See also
1816 United States presidential election
1816–17 United States House of Representatives elections
1816–17 United States Senate elections

References

1816 elections in the United States
1816